Gaslighter may refer to:

 Gas lighter, the igniter for a gas stove
 Gaslighter (album), a 2020 album by The Chicks
 Gaslighter (song), a 2020 song by The Chicks
 Someone who engages in gaslighting, manipulating a person into questioning their sanity

See also
Gaslamp (disambiguation)
Gaslight (disambiguation)
 Gas lighting, artificial light produced by combusting gas